The Road of Azrael is a collection of historical short stories by Robert E. Howard.  It was first published in 1979 by Donald M. Grant, Publisher, Inc. in an edition of 2,150 copies, of which, 300 were boxed and signed by the artist.

Contents
 "Hawks over Egypt"
 "The Track of Bohemond"
 "Gates of Empire"
 "The Road of Azrael"
 "The Way of the Swords" (originally named "The Road of the Eagles" by Howard)

References

1979 short story collections
Short story collections by Robert E. Howard
Donald M. Grant, Publisher books